Dorozhkin is a rural locality (a khutor) in Krasninskoye Rural Settlement, Danilovsky District, Volgograd Oblast, Russia. The population was 11 as of 2010.

Geography 
Dorozhkin is located in steppe, 37 km southeast of Danilovka (the district's administrative centre) by road. Popki is the nearest rural locality.

References 

Rural localities in Danilovsky District, Volgograd Oblast